Todd Lamonte Williams (April 9, 1978 – January 6, 2014) was an American football offensive tackle. He was drafted by the Tennessee Titans in the seventh round of the 2003 NFL Draft. He played college football at Florida State.

Williams also played for the Tampa Bay Buccaneers, Green Bay Packers, San Jose SaberCats and California Redwoods.

Williams was a 2001 initiate of Phi Beta Sigma fraternity in the Mu Epsilon chapter.

Professional career

Tennessee Titans
Williams was drafted by the Tennessee Titans in the 7th round with the 255th overall pick in the 2003 NFL Draft. He appeared in seven games before being waived after the 2005 season opener.

California Redwoods
Williams was signed by the California Redwoods of the United Football League on September 2, 2009.

Death
On January 6, 2014, Todd Williams was found dead in his residence. Williams's mother, Ozepher Fluker, became concerned when she had not heard from Williams, who had been suffering from stomach pain and ageusia. A county sheriff entered his home and found Williams deceased. An autopsy will be performed to confirm official cause of death.

References

http://www.bradenton.com/2014/01/07/4922801/former-southeast-fsu-star-williams.html

External links
Florida State Seminoles bio
Death details

1978 births
2014 deaths
Sportspeople from Bradenton, Florida
Players of American football from Florida
American football offensive tackles
Florida State Seminoles football players
Tennessee Titans players
Tampa Bay Buccaneers players
San Jose SaberCats players
Sacramento Mountain Lions players
Green Bay Packers players